Fujairah Stadium is a multi-use stadium located in Fujairah, United Arab Emirates. It is currently used mostly for football matches and is the home ground of Fujairah SC. The stadium holds 10,645 people.

References

Year of establishment missing
Football venues in the United Arab Emirates
Buildings and structures in the Emirate of Fujairah
Sport in the Emirate of Fujairah
Dibba FC